, is a sight seeing toll road going through the Asamayama mountain, in Mie Prefecture, Japan.

The road is 16.5 km long and 6.5 m wide. The tolls are collected at the Iseshi-ujitachichou and Tobachou locations.  As of August 2006, the toll for 2 wheeled vehicles was ¥860 and for cars ¥1220.

Toll roads in Japan
Tourist attractions in Mie Prefecture
Roads in Mie Prefecture

ja:朝熊山#伊勢志摩スカイライン